The Cameroon men's national football team results and fixtures for 2010. Stats are up to date as of 12 March 2010.

Record

Updated as of June 24, 2010

Goal scorers

Updated as of June 24, 2010

Match results

Friendly matches

2010 Africa Cup of Nations

2010 FIFA World Cup

2012 CAF Qualifiers

References

 Cameroon: Fixtures and Results

2010
2010 national football team results
National